The Voice of Conscience may refer to:

 The Voice of Conscience (1912 film), an American silent short film
 The Voice of Conscience (1917 film), an American silent film
 The Voice of Conscience (1920 film), an Austrian silent film